was a town located in Hita District, Ōita Prefecture, Japan.

As of 2003, the town had an estimated population of 6,295 and the density of 61.82 persons per km2. The total area was 101.83 km2.

On March 22, 2005, Amagase, along with the town of Ōyama, and the villages of Kamitsue, Maetsue and Nakatsue (all from Hita District), was merged into the expanded city of Hita.

Dissolved municipalities of Ōita Prefecture